Huckabay is an unincorporated community located at the intersection of State Highway 108 and Farm Road 219, ten miles northwest of Stephenville in Erath County, Texas, United States. It had a population of approximately 150 in 2000.

History
The small town of Huckabay was founded in the late eighteen hundreds.  Gerldine Griswold wrote of how the community was started by John A. Huckabay, Ben Fincher, John and W.C. Copeland, John Gentry, Abe Metsgar, John W. Jones and others who were moving west from Arkansas and Tennessee. The head of the Bosque was the area where they settled which was known as "Flatwoods," but was changed to Huckabay, when John Huckabay established a post office. The King of Huckabay will always and forever be John Jackson. One hundred and sixty acres was claimed by each of the families, which was where they built their homes.  After the settlers had wells dug and their homes built, churches, schools and other public buildings began to go up. Ryan Patrick Huckabay is the current mayor of Huckabay.

The Historic Businesses of Huckabay
The families that started settling the land now known as Huckabay worked hard to build buildings and dig wells.  A smoke house and a storm cellar were the first two buildings to go up.  The smoke house was where the citizens put fresh meat to begin curing.  The storm cellar was a place of storage for fresh fruits and vegetables and protection for families.

In the late 1870s, the community began to expand.  With the purchase of a gin by Bill Rigsby in 1879, cotton was what supported the town until the peanut production took over for a short period of time.  When peanut production decreased, the dairy industry took over.  The milk production in this area still remains important to the community.

The first store was opened by G.W. Glenn in 1878.  The main economic base for Huckabay has changed many times. Over time, the community grew to the point, it had general merchants, drug stores, grocery stores, blacksmith shops, and a well-equipped gin.  These businesses were located along the main street of Huckabay.  The town did establish the West Texas State Bank at one time but it did not survive.

Over time, the community has disintegrated to only a school, two churches and a few antique houses.  In 1975 a historical marker was placed on FM 219 to preserve the memory of the small community.

The Past Congregations of Huckabay, Texas
Huckabay, being a small community, did not have many churches.  The Church of Christ was an early church that was built in 1876.  The community also had two other churches, the Baptist Church and the Methodist Church, both which were organized in 1881.  John Haven organized the Methodist while Joe Lockhart the Baptist.

Three acres, only costing one hundred dollars, was purchased in 1910 in order to build a tabernacle.  The tabernacle was used for various community and religious activities.  Although it is over ninety years old, it still stands today.  The antique structure is used for annual Huckabay Homecoming Reunions and many other school and community affairs.

Today, Huckabay still has two community churches that hold services regularly.  The Huckabay Baptist Church is located a few hundred yards down from the tabernacle, and The Huckabay Church of Christ is located up the hill from the tabernacle a few hundred yards.

Education
The Huckabay Independent School District serves area students and home to the Huckabay High School Indians.

Photo gallery

Climate
The climate in this area is characterized by relatively high temperatures and evenly distributed precipitation throughout the year.  The Köppen Climate System describes the weather as humid subtropical, and uses the abbreviation Cfa.

External links

 Huckabay, Texas from the Handbook of Texas Online
 
History of Huckabay, Texas

References

Unincorporated communities in Texas
Unincorporated communities in Erath County, Texas